Hinterland is a 1998 French drama film directed by Jacques Nolot. It was screened in the Directors' Fortnight section of the 1998 Cannes Film Festival, where it won the Award of the Youth. It was nominated for Best First Feature Film at the 24th César Awards.

External links

1998 films
1998 drama films
French drama films
1990s French-language films
Films directed by Jacques Nolot
1998 directorial debut films
1990s French films